The following is a list of notable deaths in July 1999.

Entries for each day are listed alphabetically by surname. A typical entry lists information in the following sequence:
 Name, age, country of citizenship at birth, subsequent country of citizenship (if applicable), reason for notability, cause of death (if known), and reference.

July 1999

1
Dennis Brown, 42, Jamaican reggae singer, pneumothorax.
Edward Dmytryk, 90, Canadian-born Canadian film director, heart and kidney failure.
Hans Maldonado, 41, Ecuadorian football player.
Forrest Mars, 95, American businessman and candy magnate.
Guy Mitchell, 72, American traditional pop singer and actor, complications of surgery.
Jack Moroney, 81, Australian cricket player.
Ernst Nievergelt, 89, Swiss cyclist and Olympic medalist.
Joshua Nkomo, 82, Zimbabwean politician, prostate cancer.
Sylvia Sidney, 88, American film actress (Summer Wishes, Winter Dreams, Beetlejuice, An Early Frost), oesophageal cancer.
Roman Tmetuchl, 73, Palauan political leader.
Stig Westerberg, 80, Swedish conductor and pianist.
Willie Whitelaw, 81, British politician.

2
Viktor Chebrikov, 76, Soviet head of the KGB (1982–1988).
George Deiderich, 63, American football player.
George Druxman, 69, Canadian football player.
Xavier Gélin, 53, French actor and film producer, cancer.
Jack Plumley, 88, British Anglican priest, egyptologist and academic.
Mario Puzo, 78, American novelist (The Godfather) and screenwriter (Superman, The Cotton Club), Oscar winner (1973, 1975), heart failure.
Asoka Weeraratna, 80, Sri Lankan (Sinhala) Buddhist missionary.

3
Reg Bishop, 86, Australian politician.
Ricky Byrdsong, 43, American basketball coach and killing spree victim, shot.
Yueh Feng, 90, Chinese film director and screenwriter.
Ibragim Gasanbekov, 29, Azerbaijani football player, traffic collision.
Mimi Nelson, 76, Swedish film actress.
Pelageya Polubarinova-Kochina, 100, Soviet and Russian mathematician.
Paulo Porto, 81, Brazilian actor, film producer, director and screenwriter.
Mark Sandman, 46, American musician (Morphine), heart attack.
Jack Vincent, 95, English ornithologist.

4
Ronny Graham, 79, American actor, theater director, and writer, liver disease.
Ruby Johnson, 63, American soul singer.
Mark O'Brien, 49, American journalist, poet, and advocate for the disabled.
Jack Watson, 84, English actor, leukemia.

5
Len Butterfield, 85, New Zealand cricket player.
Jean-Pierre Darras, 71, French actor, cancer.
Joan Kemp-Welch, 92, British stage and film actress.
C. Walton Lillehei, 80, American surgeon and open-heart surgery pioneer.
Harald Philipp, 78, German film director, screenwriter and actor.
Roberta Sherwood, 86, American singer.
Thea Tewi, 97, German-American sculptor and lingerie designer.

6
Bernardo Gandulla, 83, Argentine football player and coach.
Gary M. Heidnik, 55, American convicted murderer, execution by lethal injection.
M. L. Jaisimha, 60, Indian cricket player, lung cancer.
Pisith Pilika, 34, Cambodian ballet dancer and actress, shot.
Joaquín Rodrigo, 97, Spanish composer and pianist.
Sherley Anne Williams, 54, American novelist, poet and professor.
Barry Winchell, 21, United States Army infantry soldier, murdered.

7
Emilio Sánchez Font, 78, Cuban-American artist.
James Gahagan, American abstract expressionist painter.
Brima Kamara, 27, Sierra Leonean football player.
Ryu Mitsuse, 71, Japanese novelist, science fiction writer, and essayist.
Richard Müller, 95, German chemist.
Julie Campbell Tatham, 91, American writer of children's novels.

8
Ángel Lulio Cabrera, 90, Argentinian botanist.
Adolf Christian, 65, Austrian bicycle racer.
Mavis Thorpe Clark, 90, Australian novelist and writer for children.
Pete Conrad, 69, American astronaut, motorcycle accident.
Allen Lee Davis, 54, American murderer, execution by electric chair.
Frank Lubin, 89, Lithuanian-American basketball player.
Malcolm Mackay, 79, Australian politician, traffic collision.
Robert Morrison, 90, American attorney and politician.
Elemér Terták, 80, Hungarian figure skater and Olympian.
Shafik Wazzan, 74, Lebanese politician.
Mehdi Haeri Yazdi, 76, Iranian philosopher and Shia Islamic cleric.

9
Karl Adam, 75, German football player.
Robert de Cotret, 55, Canadian politician.
James L. Farmer, Jr., 79, American civil rights activist, complications from diabetes.
Esme Mackinnon, 85, British alpine skier and world champion downhill and slalom.
Samuel Sanders, 62, American classical pianist.

10
John Scott-Ellis, 9th Baron Howard de Walden, 86, British peer and thoroughbred racehorse owner/breeder.
Walter R. Evans, 79, American control theorist.
Gil Johnson, 75, American gridiron football player.
Ulla Lindström, 89, Swedish journalist and politician.

11
Burton Dreben, 71, American philosopher.
Marcelo Fernan, 72, Filipino lawyer and politician, Chief Justice of the Supreme Court of the Philippines.
Helen Forrest, 82, American singer of traditional pop and swing music, heart failure.
Everett Greenbaum, 79, American television and film writer and actor.
Henry Kimbro, 87, American Negro league baseball player.
Lasse Lindroth, 26, Iranian-Swedish comedian, actor and writer, car accident.
Roaring Lion, 91, Trinidad and Tobago calypso singer and composer.
John Henry Sharpe, 77, Bermudian politician, Premier (1975-1975).

12
Bill Flett, 55, Canadian hockey player, liver failure.
Alex Gordon, 82, Welsh architect.
Harvey Jackins, 83, American founder and principal theorist of Re-evaluation Counseling.
Rajendra Kumar, 69, Indian film actor, cancer.
Mircea Nedelciu, 48, Romanian short-story writer, novelist and essayist, Hodgkin's disease.
Kazimierz Ostrowski, 82, Polish painter.
Bill Owen, 85, British actor and songwriter, pancreatic cancer.
Jan Panenka, 77, Czech pianist.
Zita Szeleczky, 84, Hungarian actress.
Cornelius Wiebe, 106, Canadian physician and politician.

13
Donald D. Engen, 75, American naval officer, administrator of the FAA, and museum director, aviation accident.
Muhammetnazar Gapurow, 77, First Secretary of the Communist Party of the Turkmen SSR (1969 – 1985).
Yevgeny Goryansky, 70, Russian football player and football coach.
Herta Heuwer, 86, German chef and inventor of the currywurst.
Josef Moc, 91, Czechoslovak basketball player.

14
Maria Banuș, 85, Romanian poet, essayist, and prose writer.
Hugh Gallarneau, 82, American gridiron football player (Chicago Bears).
Gene Hart, 68, American sportscaster for the Philadelphia Flyers, kidney and liver failure.
Władysław Hasior, 71, Polish sculptor.
Abdul Ahad Karzai, 77, Afghan politician, homicide.
Umyar Mavlikhanov, 61, Soviet fencer and Olympic champion.
Gar Samuelson, 41, American musician, drummer of thrash metal band Megadeth, liver failure.
Trudi Schoop, 95, Swiss-American dance therapy pioneer.
John R. Steelman, 99, American academic and first White House Chief of Staff.
Pietro Tarchini, 77, Swiss professional cyclist.
Sal Trapani, 72, American comic-book artist.
Sadao Yamahana, 63, Japanese politician.

15
Sir Richard Thompson, 1st Baronet, 86, British politician.
George Brown, 79, American politician, complications following heart surgery.
Simon Ramsay, 16th Earl of Dalhousie, 84, British land owner, politician and colonial governor.
Horacio Podestá, 87, Argentine rower and Olympic medalist.
Dick Richardson, 65, Welsh heavyweight boxer, cancer.
Kamalendumati Shah, Indian politician and social worker, brain cancer.

16
Ross H. Arnett, Jr., 80, American entomologist.
Carolyn Bessette-Kennedy, 33, American socialite and wife of John F. Kennedy Jr., plane crash.
John F. Kennedy Jr., 38, American journalist, lawyer, and son of John F. Kennedy and Jacqueline Kennedy Onassis, plane crash.
Alan Macnaughton, 95, Canadian parliamentarian and Speaker of the House.
André Martinet, 91, French linguist.
Franco Montoro, 83, Brazilian politician and lawyer.
Hamid Nitgi, 78, Iranian poet, writer and author.
Alfred Raoul, 60, Congolese politician, Prime Minister (1968-1969).
Whit Wyatt, 91, American baseball player, pneumonia.
Hiromi Yanagihara, 19, Japanese singer and actress, heart failure.

17
Arthur Hoag, 78, American astronomer.
Daniel H. H. Ingalls, Sr., 83, American professor of Sanskrit.
Donal McCann, 56, Irish actor, pancreatic cancer.
Kevin Newman, 65, Australian soldier and politician, systemic lupus erythematosus.
Kevin Wilkinson, 41, English drummer, suicide.
Patricia Zipprodt, 74, American costume designer, cancer.

18
Meir Ariel, 57, Israeli singer-songwriter, boutonneuse fever.
Rubén Bernuncio, 23, Argentine football player, renal failure following motorcycle accident.
Donald Eugene Chambers, 68, American marine and founder of the Bandidos Motorcycle Club.
Jatin Kanakia, 46, Indian actor.
Pandi Raidhi, 68, Albanian film and theatre actor.
Laurie Scott, 82, English footballer.
Tody Smith, 50, American gridiron football player.

19
Donna Allen, 78, American pioneer feminist, civil rights activist, historian and economist.
Jesús Codina, 60, Spanish basketball player and coach.
Cavernario Galindo, 75, Mexican luchador and film actor.
Ludwik Gross, 94, Polish-American virologist, stomach cancer.
José Luis Madrid, 66, Spanish screenwriter, producer and film director.
Jerold Wells, 90, English actor.
Doreen Yarwood, 81, English historian and architecture critic.

20
Emil Andres, 88, American racecar driver.
Sandra Gould, 82, American film and television actor (Bewitched) and writer, complications of surgery.
Jean-Jacques Lamboley, 78, French cyclist.
James Muirhead, 74, Australian judge and Royal Commissioner.

21
Kurt Burris, 67, American gridiron football player.
Peter Carter, 69, British children's author.
Jun Etō, 66, Japanese literary critic, suicide.
David Ogilvy, 88, British advertising tycoon, the "Father of Advertising".
Kim Pyong-sik, 80, North Korean politician.

22
Gennadiy Agapov, 65, Soviet and Russian race walker and Olympian.
Abelardo Díaz Alfaro, 82, Puerto Rican author.
Howard Arkley, 48, Australian artist, accidental overdose.
Claudio Rodríguez García, 65, Spanish poet.
Hakim Abdul Hameed, 90, Indian physician and universiry chancellor.
Mary Kerridge, 85, English actress and theatre director.
Lauro Ortega Martínez, 89, Mexican politician and veterinarian.
Ladislav Slovák, 79, Slovak conductor.
Arun Thapa, Nepali singer and songwriter, lung and liver ailment.

23
Hassan II, 70, Moroccan monarch, King of Morocco (since 1961), heart attack.
Josef Holub, 69, Czech botanist and pteridologist, heart attack.
Frank Minis Johnson, 80, United States district judge, pneumonia.
Kelvin Lancaster, 74, Australian mathematical economist.
Paul Lucier, 68, Canadian businessman and politician, bone cancer.
Emma Tenayuca, 82, Mexican American labor leader, and educator, Alzheimer's disease.
Dmitri Tertyshny, 22, Russian ice hockey defenseman, boating accident.
Stanley Tretick, 78, American photojournalist.

24
Alexander Abian, 76, Iranian-born Armenian-American mathematician.
Le Quang Dao, 77, Vietnamese politician.
Eva de Vitray-Meyerovitch, 89, French scientist, translator and writer.
Demetrius DuBose, 28, American football player, shot by police.
Albert Leake, 69, English footballer.
Bijaya Malla, 74, Nepalese poet, novelist and playwright.
Don Martin, 79, American basketball player and coach.
Rona McKenzie, 76, New Zealand cricket player.
Henk Pellikaan, 88, Dutch football player.

25
Martin Agronsky, 84, American journalist and television host, congestive heart failure.
Princess Iskander, 82, last member of the Russian House of Romanov.
Pentti Lammio, 79, Finnish speed skater and Olympic medalsit.
Raul Manglapus, 80, Filipino politician, throat cancer.

26
Walter Jackson Bate, 81, American literary critic and biographer.
Béla Bay, 92, Hungarian Olympic épée and foil fencer.
Philippa Gail, 56, British actress, cancer.
Phedon Gizikis, 82, Greek army general and president under the Junta.
Alan Karcher, 56, American politician.
Qian Linzhao, 92, Chinese physicist.
Joseph Morvan, 74, French road bicycle racer.
Paul Rickards, 73, American gridiron football player.
John W. N. Watkins, 74, English philosopher and professor of Economics, heart attack.

27
Aleksandr Aleksandrov, 86, Soviet/Russian mathematician, physicist and philosopher.
Ronald Backus, 77, British sailor and Olympic medalist.
Matjaž Cvikl, 32, Slovenian football player, cancer.
Louis Déprez, 78, French racing cyclist.
Harry Edison, 83, American jazz trumpeter.
Amaryllis Fleming, 73, British cello performer and teacher.
Elías Jácome, 53, Ecuadorian football referee.
Armand Le Moal, 85, French racing cyclist.
Mahlathini, 61, South African mbaqanga singer, complications of diabetes.
Malachi Martin, 78, Irish-American Catholic priest and novelist, fall.
Michael Winkelman, 53, American child actor.

28
Doris Carter, 87, Australian military officer, public servant, and Olympic athlete.
Trygve Haavelmo, 87, Norwegian economist.
Maxim Munzuk, 89, Tuvan actor.
Francisco Risiglione, 82, Argentine boxer and Olympic medalist.
Carlos Romero, 71, Uruguayan football player.
Gerd Springer, 72, Austrian football player and coach.
Puey Ungpakorn, 83, Thai economist.
S. Howard Woodson, 83, American pastor, civil rights leader and politician.

29
Anita Carter, 66, American singer and member of the Carter family, complications of rheumatoid arthritis.
Martti Kosma, 72, Finnish football player and manager.
Anatoliy Solovyanenko, 66, Soviet operatic tenor, heart attack.
André Soubiran, 89, French physician and novelist.
Neelan Tiruchelvam, 55, Sri Lankan Tamil lawyer, academic and politician, assassinated.
Kunio Tsuji, 73, Japanese author, novelist, and scholar.

30
Ko Tai Chuen, 74, Singaporean basketball player and Olympian.
George Moorse, 63, American-German film director, heart attack.
Hermann Panzo, 41, French athlete, stroke.
Linus Suryadi AG, 48, Indonesian writer and poet.

31
Mirza Adeeb, 85, Pakistani writer of drama and short stories.
Marinus Kok, 83, Dutch prelate of the Catholic Church.
Rex Pilbeam, 91, Australian politician.
Henry W. Sawyer, 80, American lawyer, civil rights activist and politician, lung cancer.
Elena Zareschi, 83, Italian actress.

References 

1999-07
 07